FK Iskra Borčice is a Slovak association football club located in Borčice. It plays in 4. liga (4th level).

Colors and badge 
Its colors are red and white.

Honours

Domestic

 Slovak Third League (1993–)
 Winners (1): 2014–15 (Promotion)
 Slovak Cup (1961–)
 Quarter–finals 2017–18

 Current squad As of 25 February 2018For recent transfers, see List of Slovak football transfers winter 2015–16.''

Notable players 
Had international caps for their respective countries. Players whose name is listed in bold represented their countries while playing for FK Iskra Borčice.

 Miroslav Barčík
 Juraj Halenár
 Ľuboš Hanzel
 Ján Novák

Former coaches 
 Róbert Novák (2013 – May 2014)
 Anton Dragúň (June 2014 – September 2014)
 Róbert Novák (October 2014 – December 2014)
 Štefan Grendel (March 2015 – July 2015)
 Jozef Majoroš (July 2015–31 December 2015)
 Alexander Homér (5 Jan 2016–3 March 2016)
 Ivan Galád (3 March 2016 – 19 April 2016)
 Alexander Homér (19 April 2016)

References

External links
Official club website 
  
Futbalnet profile 
TJ Iskra on Borčice portal 
Eurofotbal profile 

 
Football clubs in Slovakia
Association football clubs established in 1951
Sport in Trenčín Region
1951 establishments in Czechoslovakia